BSB may refer to:

Computing
 Back-side bus, data bus in a computer

Media, arts & entertainment
 Backstreet Boys, American boy band
 British Satellite Broadcasting, former UK satellite television broadcaster

Places
 Bandar Seri Begawan, the capital of Brunei
 Brasília, Brazil
 Brasília International Airport, Brazil, IATA code
 Samarinda International Airport, BSB, Samarinda
 Varanasi Junction railway station, Varanasi, India (station code)

Banking
 Bank Services Billing, electronic bills sent by banks
 Bank state branch, branch code used in Australia
 Banking Standards Board, promoting standards in the banking industry in the UK
 Beneficial State Bank, an Oakland, California-based community development bank

Legal
 Bar Standards Board, regulating barristers in England and Wales

Schools & universities
 Basel School of Business in Switzerland
 British School of Brussels
 British School of Bahrain
 British School of Beijing
 Burgundy School of Business in France

Science and technology
 British Standard Brass, a screw thread standard

Organizations
 Bayerische Staatsbibliothek, Bavarian State Library
 Broad Sustainable Building, is a Chinese construction company
 BPO Standards Board, applying BPO standards and guidelines in real estate
 Barons Bus Lines, an American bus company

Military
 Brigade Speciale Beveiligingsopdrachten, Dutch special forces

Sports
 British Superbike Championship, motorcycle racing championship
 Broad Street Bullies, nickname of the Philadelphia Flyers teams of the 1970s
 İstanbul Büyükşehir Belediyespor (basketball) or İstanbul BŞB, Turkey

Politics
БСБ, a Russian anti-war flag